The Inntal is the valley containing the Inn river in Switzerland, Austria and Germany. The valley has a total length of 517 km and the biggest city located in Inntal is Innsbruck.

The valley is divided into the following sections based on regional and national frontiers:
 Engadin (Switzerland)
 Tyrolean Inntal (Tirol, Austria)
 Bavarian Inntal (Bavaria, Germany)
 Upper Austrian Inntal (Upper Austria, Austria)

References

Valleys of Europe
Inn (river)